Brian S. Brown (born c. 1974) is an American activist who is a co-founder of the National Organization for Marriage (NOM), and has served as its president since 2010, having previously served as executive director. NOM is a non-profit political organization established in 2007 to work against legalization of same-sex marriage in the United States. NOM's mission is "protecting marriage and the faith communities that sustain it".

Brown is also president of the World Congress of Families.

Career
In 2001, Brown became the executive director of the Family Institute of Connecticut, a socially conservative organization. On February 10, 2002 Brown presented a testimony in front of the Connecticut House Judiciary Committee on HB 5002 and HB 5001.

Since its founding in 2007, Brown has been National Organization for Marriage's executive director and was additionally named president in 2010, succeeding Maggie Gallagher. NOM led the initiative to pass California's Proposition 8 in 2008, which intended to constitutionally ban same-sex marriage in the state.

In 2012, he announced that NOM would launch a global "Dump Starbucks" campaign in response to that company's support for same-sex marriage. In October 2013, Brown announced that The National Organization for Marriage filed a lawsuit in federal court against the Internal Revenue Service for releasing confidential tax documents; the lawsuit was settled for $50,000.

In 2016, Brown announced the foundation of the International Organization for the Family (IOF), so that NOM could "focus on efforts in America,"

As of August 2018, Brown was the president of the Howard Center for Family, Religion and Society, an anti-abortion advocacy group which is part of the World Congress of Families (WCF) network supporting far right groups in Europe and other continents. He is on the Foundation Board of Trustees of CitizenGo, a Spanish anti-abortion advocacy group founded in 2013.

In late 2019, NOM filed a brief related to the cases about LGBTQ rights—Bostock v. Clayton County, Georgia; Harris Funeral Homes v. EEOC; and Altitude Express v. Zarda—pending before the Supreme Court. On October 29, 2019, two Supreme Court justices, Brett Kavanaugh and Samuel Alito, posed for a photograph with Brown inside the Court. The reason for the meeting was unclear. The other two people who posed in the photo were Gloria, Princess of Thurn and Taxis and Cardinal Gerhard Ludwig Müller.

Personal life 
Brown was raised in Whittier, California. At age 25 he converted from Quakerism to Roman Catholicism. He has a bachelor's degree from Whittier College, where he was student body president, and a master's degree in modern history from Oxford University, and is a C.Phil. at UCLA. The C.Phil. is an interim status for students who intend to complete their PhD within a given time period.

References

External links
National Organization for Marriage website
Brian S. Brown biography on National Organization for Marriage website
https://actright.com/

Living people
American anti-abortion activists
American social activists
American Roman Catholics
Whittier College alumni
University of California, Los Angeles alumni
Same-sex marriage in the United States
National Organization for Marriage people
American anti-same-sex-marriage activists
Year of birth missing (living people)
Converts to Roman Catholicism from Quakerism